Tiger Cage 2 is a 1990 Hong Kong action film directed by Yuen Woo-ping and starring Donnie Yen. The film is a sequel to the 1988 film Tiger Cage, which was also directed by Yuen, and features a new storyline with returning cast members Yen and Carol Cheng in different roles.

Plot

Dragon Yau is a hot-headed ex-cop named whose attitude has got him in trouble with his bosses and his wife. On a trip to the lawyers, he is witness to a robbery where a suitcase of money disappears and a lot of guys get shot. Somehow, he ends up with lawyer Mandy Chang on the run from the cops who think they committed a murder and from the bad guys that think they have the money. Reluctantly they are forced to form an alliance with one of the bad guys, David, who has been betrayed by the gang led by Waise Chow.

Cast
 Donnie Yen as Dragon Yau
 Rosamund Kwan as Mandy Chang
 David Wu as David
 Robin Shou as Waise Chow 
 Garry Chow as Tak 
 Carol Cheng as Petty Lee (guest star)
 Cynthia Khan as Inspector Yeung (guest star)
 Lo Lieh as Uncle Chiu
 Leung Lam-ling as Ms. Leung
 Michael Woods as Mafia
 John Salvitti as Mafia
 Dickson Lee as Kent
 Anita Lee as Ann
 Cha Chuen-yee as Philip
 Tang Wai-yiu

External links
 
 Tiger Cage 2 at Hong Kong Cinemagic
 
 

1990 films
1990 action films
1990 martial arts films
Hong Kong action films
Hong Kong martial arts films
Hong Kong sequel films
Kung fu films
Police detective films
Triad films
1990s Cantonese-language films
Films directed by Yuen Woo-ping
Films set in Hong Kong
Films shot in Hong Kong
1990s Hong Kong films